Iron Beam, officially מגן אור, "Light Shield", is a directed-energy weapon air defense system which was unveiled at the Singapore Airshow on February 11, 2014  by Israeli defense contractor Rafael Advanced Defense Systems. In addition, the system could also intercept unmanned aerial vehicles (UAVs). Iron Beam will constitute the fifth element of Israel's integrated air defense system, in addition to Arrow 2, Arrow 3, David's Sling, Barak 8 and Iron Dome.

Characteristics 
Iron Beam uses a fiber laser to destroy an airborne target within 4–5 seconds of firing at a range of 20 km. Whether acting as a stand-alone system or with external cueing as part of an air-defense system, a threat is detected by a surveillance system and tracked by vehicle platforms in order to engage. The main benefits of using a directed energy weapon over conventional missile interceptors are lower costs per shot, unlimited number of firings, lower operational costs, and less manpower. There is also no interceptor debris to fall on the area protected. The cost of each interception is negligible, unlike expensive missile interceptors—around US$2,000 per shot to cover all costs, against $100,000 to $150,000 per interceptor firing.

In 2016 laser power levels were reported to be "tens of kilowatts". While official information is not available, a 2020 report said that Iron Beam was thought to have a maximum effective range of up to 7 km, and could destroy missiles, UAVs (drones), and mortar shells around four seconds after the twin high-energy fiber-optic lasers make contact with their target.

 Iron Beam had been funded mainly by the Israeli Ministry of Defense (MoD), with Rafael pursuing increasing the range of the system and partnering with other companies to further develop the prototype. In December 2022, Rafael and Lockheed Martin announced a joint effort to develop a laser defense system based on the Iron Beam project. The aim is to produce a system made up of a pair of solid-state lasers that, when combined, could boost power up to 300 kw, as well as to use more than one beam to simultaneously burn more than one target at once.

Development 
The system is based on five years of research and development in solid-state lasers and is developed by Rafael, funded by the MoD, and  underwritten by the United States. An Iron Beam battery is composed of an air defense radar, a command and control (C2) unit, and two HEL (High Energy Laser) systems. It was intended to be mobile and to be able to be used stand-alone, but was later rendered non-mobile to address weight and power availability concerns and integrated into Iron Dome to reduce complexity. It is intended for two laser guns to initially produce 100–150 kw of power.

In April 2022, the Israeli Ministry of Defense and Rafael announced  that in a series of experiments the system successfully shot down drones, rockets, mortar bombs, and anti-tank missiles. The military pushed for an earlier deployment, possibly due to concerns that there would not be sufficient Iron Dome projectiles to combat attacks; Prime Minister Naftali Bennett said in February 2022 that Israel would deploy the system within the year. However, in October 2022 Rafael said it expects to take "two to three years" to deploy the 100+kw weapon operationally.

See also 
Light Blade, a simpler Israeli air defense laser system

References

External links 

 "Maggen Or": Israel successfully completed interception tests with a laser-based air defense system, Israeli Ministry of Defense YouTube channel

Emergency management in Israel
Military lasers
Missile defense
Proposed weapons of Israel
Rafael Advanced Defense Systems
Israeli inventions